Jacob Stacey Schreier (born September 29, 1981) is an American commercial, music video and film director. He was a founding member of Waverly Films, a Brooklyn-based filmmaking collective, and joined Park Pictures in 2006, releasing his first feature film Robot & Frank in 2012. In 2015, he released Paper Towns, an adaptation of the 2008 novel of the same name by John Green.

Early life 
Born in Berkeley, California, Jake Schreier attended the New York University Tisch School of the Arts. After graduating, he directed music videos, including one for Francis and the Lights, a performer/songwriter with whom Schreier also played keyboard for several years. He also directed commercials for products such as Absolut Vodka and Verizon phones. Together with his friends from college, he co-founded the film collective Waverly Films and continued to collaborate on film projects for television and the web.

Film career 
In 2006, Schreier signed with Park Pictures, a commercial and film production company, and worked on a number of advertising campaigns and commercials; he was noted for his work and appeared in the “Best New Directors” list of Creativity Magazine and other advertising industry magazines. In 2012, he released his first feature film, Robot & Frank, based on the screenplay by his Tisch classmate and friend Christopher Ford. The film won the Alfred P. Sloan Prize at the Sundance Film Festival, for best feature film that focuses on science or technology as a theme, tying with the Kashmiri film Valley of Saints. Robot & Frank earned Schreier critical acclaim for his feature directorial debut. Los Angeles Times film critic Kenneth Turan called it "exceptionally polished for a first-time effort", and Rolling Stone gave it three out of four stars. He also directed the film adaptation of the John Green book, Paper Towns, which was released on July 24, 2015.

In June 2022, Schreier was hired to direct the Marvel Studios superhero film Thunderbolts.

Filmography

Films
Robot & Frank (2012)
Paper Towns (2015)
Chance the Rapper's Magnificent Coloring World (2021)
Thunderbolts (2024)

Music videos
"The Top" by Francis and the Lights (2008)
"Darling, It's Alright" by Francis and the Lights (2010)
"Like a Dream" by Francis and the Lights (2013)
"Friends" by Francis and the Lights featuring Bon Iver and Kanye West (2016)
"Trust Nobody" by Cashmere Cat featuring Selena Gomez and Tory Lanez (2016)
"See Her Out (That's Just Life)" by Francis and the Lights (2016)
"Same Drugs" by Chance the Rapper (2017)
"9 (After Coachella)" by Cashmere Cat featuring MØ and Sophie (2017)
"May I Have This Dance" by Francis and the Lights featuring Chance the Rapper (2017)
"Want You Back" by Haim (2017)
"Eastside" by Benny Blanco, Halsey and Khalid (2018)
"The Video in the Pool" by Francis and the Lights (2018)
"I Found You" by Benny Blanco & Calvin Harris (2018)
"I Found You / Nilda's Story" by Benny Blanco, Calvin Harris, and Miguel (2019)
"I Can't Get Enough" by Selena Gomez, J Balvin, Benny Blanco, and Tainy (2019)
"Graduation by Benny Blanco, and Juice Wrld (2019)
"Emotions" by Cashmere Cat (2019)
"For Your Eyes Only" by Cashmere Cat (2019)
"Follow God" by Kanye West (2019)
"Closed on Sunday" by Kanye West (2019) 
"I Know Alone" by Haim (2020)
"Lonely" by Justin Bieber and Benny Blanco (2020)
"Issues" by Baby Keem (2021) 
"We Cry Together" by Kendrick Lamar (2022)

Television
Alpha House (2013), 1 episode
Shameless (2016), 1 episode
I'm Dying Up Here (2017–18), 2 episodes
Lodge 49 (2018–19), 6 episodes
Kidding (2018–20), 6 episodes
Dave (2021), 1 episode
Brand New Cherry Flavor (2021), 2 episodes
The Premise (2021), 1 episode
Minx (2022), 1 episode
Beef (2023), 6 episodes

References

External links
 

1981 births
Living people
American film directors
Alfred P. Sloan Prize winners
Tisch School of the Arts alumni